The Madisonville Commercial Historic District, in Madisonville, Kentucky, is an  historic district which was listed on the National Register of Historic Places in 1988.

The Hopkins County Courthouse, is the only building in the district which is free-standing, upon the public square; the others are in rows.
It includes much of the historic commercial and governmental center of Madisonville.

The courthouse was built in 1938 and has a Doric-style portico.

It includes a two-and-a-half-story brick and stone Richardsonian Romanesque bank building, the Morton Bank, at  7 North Main St., built around 1890.

It is centered upon Center and Main Streets.

References

Historic districts on the National Register of Historic Places in Kentucky
National Register of Historic Places in Hopkins County, Kentucky
Victorian architecture in Kentucky
Chicago school architecture in Kentucky
Commercial buildings on the National Register of Historic Places in Kentucky